Manuel Štrlek (born 1 December 1988) is a Croatian handball player for Telekom Veszprém and for the Croatian national team.

He was named into the All Star Team both at the 2010 and the 2016 EHF European Men's Handball Championship.

Honours

Club
Zagreb
Dukat Premier League: 2006–07, 2007–08, 2008–09, 2009–10, 2010–11, 2011–12
Croatian Cup: 2007, 2008, 2009, 2010, 2011, 2012

Kielce
EHF Champions League: 2015–16

Individual
All-Star Left winger of the EHF Champions League: 2016
Croatian handball player of the year: 2016

References

 MANUEL ŠTRLEK EKSKLUZIVNO ZA SN: 'OVO ŠTO SE SADA DOGAĐA STVARNO NEMA SMISLA!' Legenda hrvatskog rukometa otkrila pravu istinu o otkazu reprezentaciji

External links

1988 births
Living people
Croatian male handball players
Handball players from Zagreb
Handball players at the 2012 Summer Olympics
Handball players at the 2016 Summer Olympics
Olympic handball players of Croatia
Olympic bronze medalists for Croatia
Olympic medalists in handball
Medalists at the 2012 Summer Olympics
RK Zagreb players
Vive Kielce players
Veszprém KC players
Expatriate handball players in Poland
Croatian expatriate sportspeople in Hungary
Croatian expatriate sportspeople in Poland
21st-century Croatian people